Erigeron chrysopsidis is a North American species of flowering plants in the family Asteraceae known by the common name dwarf yellow fleabane. It is found in the western United States: southeastern Washington, Oregon, extreme northern California, northern Nevada, Idaho.

Erigeron chrysopsidis is a very small perennial herb up to 15 cm (8 inches) tall, forming a taproot. Most of the leaves are low and close to the ground. Each stem produces only one flower head, with 20-60 yellow ray florets plus numerous yellow disc florets.

Varieties
 Erigeron chrysopsidis var. austiniae (Greene) G.L.Nesom - California, Idaho, Nevada, Oregon
 Erigeron chrysopsidis var. brevifolius  Piper - Oregon
 Erigeron chrysopsidis var. chrysopsidis - Oregon, Washington

References

chrysopsidis
Flora of the Western United States
Plants described in 1884
Flora without expected TNC conservation status